Women on the Web may refer to:

San Francisco Women on the Web, a women's website
wowOwow, a women's website founded as Women on the Web

See also
Women on Web, an online abortion help service